Fred Lawrence Breining (born November 15, 1955) is an American former pitcher in Major League Baseball who played from 1980 through 1985 for the San Francisco Giants and the Montreal Expos. He had been traded along with Ed Whitson and Al Holland from the Pittsburgh Pirates to the Giants for Bill Madlock, Lenny Randle and Dave Roberts on June 28, . Breining won 27 games at the MLB level, and on September 23, 1981, he picked up his only major league save against the Dodgers. Breining pitched three shutout innings to preserve an 8–4 victory over their rival Los Angeles Dodgers.

His career was cut short when pitching to Ray Knight, when he fielded a bunt and threw it to first, only to blow out his shoulder. Breining never played another inning as a Major Leaguer. After that, he became an instructor at the Dusty Baker International Baseball Academy, and also offered private lessons in the Sacramento area along with Lloyd Moseby, who served as hitting coach.

References

Sources

, or Retrosheet, or Pura Pelota

1955 births
Living people
American expatriate baseball players in Canada
Auburn Phillies players
Baseball players from San Francisco
Birmingham Barons players
Buffalo Bisons (minor league) players
Charleston Pirates players
Columbus Clippers players
Indianapolis Indians players
Major League Baseball pitchers
Montreal Expos players
Nashville Sounds players
Navegantes del Magallanes players
American expatriate baseball players in Venezuela
Niagara Falls Pirates players
Phoenix Giants players
Salem Pirates players
San Francisco Giants players
San Mateo Bulldogs baseball players
Shreveport Captains players
Tigres de Aragua players